Robert Maitland Dinwiddie (born 29 December 1982) is an English professional golfer.

Early years
Dinwiddie was born in Dumfries, Scotland. He was assisted by College Prospects of America to gain a golf scholarship at Tennessee State University, and was the number one ranked English golfer.

Dinwiddie won Welsh and Scottish Amateur Open Stroke Play Championships in 2005, and when he also claimed the English Amateur Open Stroke Play Championship, otherwise known as the Brabazon Trophy, in 2006, he became the first person to hold all three titles at the same time.

Professional career
Dinwiddie turned professional towards the end of 2006 and joined the Challenge Tour. He had an immediate impact, finishing tied 11th in just his second tournament. He went on to end the season in 8th place on the rankings, aided by back to back victories in August at the Scottish Challenge and the Rolex Trophy, which was enough to gain automatic promotion to the European Tour.

In his first season on the European Tour, Dinwiddie had five top ten finishes, including tied 3rd at the BMW Asian Open and tied 6th at the Barclays Scottish Open, on his way to 72nd on the final Order of Merit. He also qualified for the U.S. Open at Torrey Pines, through final qualifying at Walton Heath. He made an impressive major championship début, finishing in a tie for 36th place.

After a difficult 2009 season, Dinwiddie returned to the Challenge Tour for 2010, where he promptly won the Kenya Open, the second event of the year. He followed this with a string of top ten finishes to ensure a return to the main tour for 2011.

Amateur wins
2005 Welsh Amateur Open Stroke Play Championship, Scottish Amateur Open Stroke Play Championship, Simon Bolivar Cup
2006 Brabazon Trophy

Professional wins (3)

Challenge Tour wins (3)

Results in major championships

CUT = missed the half-way cut
"T" = tied
NT = No tournament due to the COVID-19 pandemic
Note: Dinwiddie only played in the U.S. Open and The Open Championship.

Team appearances
Amateur
Walker Cup (representing Great Britain & Ireland): 2005
St Andrews Trophy (representing Great Britain & Ireland): 2006 (winners)
Simon Bolivar Cup (representing England): 2005

See also
2007 Challenge Tour graduates
2010 Challenge Tour graduates
2013 Challenge Tour graduates

References

External links

English male golfers
European Tour golfers
People educated at Barnard Castle School
Sportspeople from Dumfries
1982 births
Living people